Western Baltic or West Baltic may refer to the:

 western part of the Baltic Sea region, or the
 Western Baltic languages, associated with the
 Western Baltic cultures.